The Selenite Range is a mountain range in western Pershing County, Nevada.

The Fox Range lies to the west across the San Emidio Desert valley and the south end of the Black Rock Desert playa. Gerlach and Empire are two communities on the foothills and just to the northwest of the range. These communities supported the gypsum mines in the range during their active period. The range was named for deposits of selenite, a variety of gypsum.

Named Peaks in the range from north to south include: Selenite Peak, ; Luxor Peak, ; Kumiva Peak, ; Purgatory Peak, ; and Mt. Limbo, .

References 

Mountain ranges of Pershing County, Nevada
Mountain ranges of Nevada